No. 41 Squadron has two detachments located at Palam under Western Air Command and at Gauhati under Eastern Air Command. The Squadron participates in operations involving air, land and airdrop of troops, equipment, supplies, and support or augment special operations forces, when appropriate.

History
The No. 41 Squadron were raised in 1958 at Jodhpur and moved to the present location.
During the conflict with Pakistan in 1965, the squadron flew a total of 614 Op missions in support of front-line troops.

The otters were phased out in 1984, the squadron became the first unit to induct, Dornier aircraft into the IAF inventory. Avro aircraft joined the squadron in 1996, making it only IAF unit to have both light and medium transport aircraft on its strength.

Lineage
 Constituted as No. 41 Squadron (Otters) on 1 March 1958
 Dornier 228 Aircraft was inducted on 9 November 2020

Assignments
 Indo-Pakistani War of 1965
 Indo-Pakistani War of 1971

Aircraft
 DHC-3 Otter
 Do 228
 HS-748
 Dornier 228

Current Inventry
 HS-748
 Dornier 228

References

041